Carbeth is a hamlet in Stirlingshire,  west of Strathblane and  north of Clydebank.  Named features include Carbeth Hill, Carbeth Loch and the estate of Carbeth Guthrie.  There is a community of huts here which was established in 1918 after the First World War, as a summer camp for returned soldiers.

Famous residents

 William Smith of Carbeth Guthrie, Lord Provost of Glasgow 1822–24

References

External links
 

Protected areas of Stirling (council area)